William Charles Skurla (born June 1, 1956, in Duluth, Minnesota, United States) is the Primate of the Ruthenian Greek Catholic Church and the Metropolitan Archeparch or Archbishop of the Ruthenian Catholic Archeparchy of Pittsburgh. He succeeded Archbishop Basil Myron Schott, who died in August 2010 of lymphoma. Skurla was appointed on January 19, 2012, by Pope Benedict XVI as metropolitan, and enthroned in a Divine Liturgy at the Cathedral of St. John the Baptist in Munhall, Pennsylvania, on April 18, 2012.

See also
 Catholic Church in the United States
 Historical list of the Catholic bishops of the United States
 List of Catholic bishops in the United States

References

External links
 
His Eminence Most Reverend William C. Skurla, D.D. - The Carpathian Connection
Archeparchy of Pittsburgh: Metropolitan Archbishop William Skurla
William C. Skurla, Byzantine Catholic Eparchy of Passaic
2008 Enthronement (Passaic)

1956 births
Metropolitan bishops
American Eastern Catholic bishops
People from Duluth, Minnesota
Ruthenian Catholic bishops
21st-century Eastern Catholic bishops
Living people
Members of the Congregation for the Oriental Churches
21st-century American clergy